Fundacja Pomoc Polakom na Wschodzie (The Foundation Aid to Poles in the East) is a foundation created by Polish government (State Treasury) in order to facilitate the cooperation between Polish government and Polonia in the East (primarily, former Soviet Union). Among the goals of the foundation is to provide support for Polish cultural and educational institutions abroad.

See also
Association "Polish Community"

External links
 Homepage

Organizations established in 1992
Polish diaspora organizations
Foundations based in Poland
1992 establishments in Poland